Lake Beatrice is a  natural lake on the lower eastern side of Mount Sedgwick in the West Coast Range of Western Tasmania, Australia.

Lake Beatrice is higher in altitude than the nearby Lake Burbury, however it is not visible from that level, but can be seen either from the air or the higher slopes of the eastern part of Mount Lyell or the upper levels of Mount Sedgwick.

The lake was a reference point for the planned Great Western Railway that was considered at the end of the nineteenth century; however was never built.

The name of the lake and adjacent ground is tied into exploration leases held in the area.

The  Lake Beatrice Conservation Area starts in the location of Lake Beatrice and continues north to Lake Huntley and Lake Rolleston; and it is bordered on either side by the  Tyndall Regional Reserve.

See also

List of reservoirs and dams in Tasmania
List of lakes in Tasmania

References

Further reading
 
 

Beatrice
West Coast Range